Jessie Smith may refer to:

Jessie Payne Margoliouth (1856–1933), née Smith, Syriac scholar
Jessie Willcox Smith (1863–1935), American illustrator 
Jessie Evans Smith (born Jessie Ella Evans; 1902–1971), wife of Joseph Fielding Smith
Jessie Maye Smith (1907–2005), American ornithologist
J. L. Smith (born Jessie L. Smith), American baseball pitcher
Jessie Carney Smith (born 1930), American librarian and educator
Jessie Smith (singer) (1941–2021), American R&B vocalist

See also
Jessica Smith (disambiguation)
Jesse Smith (disambiguation)